Desmond Meagher (7 March 1944 – 9 March 2011) was an Australian rules footballer who played with Hawthorn in the Victorian Football League (VFL).

Football career
Meagher was a left-footed wingman, recruited to Hawthorn from Old Xaverians. He debuted for Hawthorn in 1966 and such was his swift rise that by the following season he was playing interstate football for Victoria. In 1971 he played in the Hawthorn's Premiership-winning side against St Kilda. He played in the 1975 Grand Final as a reserve. He retired at the end of 1976 and accepted a position as coach of Kilsyth.

He was coach of Hawthorn's reserves team which consistently played finals during the 1980s and won a Premiership in 1985.

Death
Meagher suffered a stroke and died on 9 March 2011, two days after his 67th birthday.

Honours and achievements 
Hawthorn
 VFL premiership player: 1971
 2× Minor premiership: 1971, 1975

Individual
 Hawthorn life member

References

External links

1944 births
2011 deaths
Australian rules footballers from Victoria (Australia)
Hawthorn Football Club players
Hawthorn Football Club Premiership players
Old Xaverians Football Club players
Place of birth missing
Place of death missing
One-time VFL/AFL Premiership players